"It's a Summer Thang" is the title of a rap/R&B single by M-Doc featuring Chantay Savage, and Stevio from the 1995 album M. Doc Wit Stevio: C'mon Getcha Groove On. It was the first single from his album of the same title. Billboard called it "a radio friendly ditty, complemented by Savage's sassy vocalizing".

The music video was filmed in Chicago in 1994.

Chart positions

References

1994 singles
1994 songs
Chantay Savage songs
Songs written by M-Doc
Songs written by Chantay Savage
RCA Records singles
American hip hop songs